The 1942 Michigan State Spartans football team represented Michigan State College as an independent in the 1942 college football season. In their tenth season under head coach Charlie Bachman, the Spartans compiled a 4–3–2 record and lost their annual rivalry game with Michigan by a 20 to 0 score. In inter-sectional play, the team played both Temple and Oregon State to 7–7 ties, lost to Washington State (25–13), and defeated West Virginia (7–0).

Schedule

Game summaries

Michigan

On October 3, 1942, Michigan State played Michigan. Playing in Ann Arbor in front of 39,163 spectators (the smallest crowd to see a Michigan-Michigan State game since 1935), the Wolverines defeated the Spartans, 20–0. With Don Kuzma injured, Don Robinson got the start at left halfback. Robinson scored the first touchdown for Michigan in the third quarter. Frank Wardley and Warren Yaap also scored touchdowns for Michigan. Jim Briske converted two PATs.

References

Michigan State
Michigan State Spartans football seasons
Michigan State Spartans football